Barry Steven Frank Sheene  (11 September 1950 – 10 March 2003) was a British professional motorcycle racer. He competed in Grand Prix motorcycle racing and was a two-time world champion, winning consecutive 500cc titles in 1976 and 1977.

Sheene's 1977 title remained as Britain's last solo motorcycle world championship until Danny Kent in 2015 in the Moto3 category.

After a racing career stretching from 1968 to 1984 he retired from competition and relocated to Australia, working as a motorsport commentator and property developer.

Early life
Sheene was born off the Gray's Inn Road, Bloomsbury, London, the second child of parents Frank, who had been resident engineer at the Royal College of Surgeons, and was himself a former competitive rider who retired in 1956 and an experienced motorcycle mechanic. and Iris. He grew up in Queen Square, Holborn, London. Before entering road racing Sheene found work as a messenger and delivery driver.

Career
Sheene began competitive motorcycle racing in 1968, winning his first races at Brands Hatch riding father Frank's 125cc and 250cc Bultacos. He improved to second behind Chas Mortimer in 1969 in the 125cc class on the Bultaco.

By 1970, Sheene had become the British 125cc champion at age 20, riding a former Suzuki factory racing team motorcycle that he purchased for £2,000. The 1967 Suzuki RT67 twin-cylinder motorcycle had previously been ridden by Suzuki Factory-backed rider, Stuart Graham in the 1968 Grands Prix and in selected 1969 events. In 1971, still riding the same Suzuki twin, he finished second in the 125cc World Championship, probably missing the title due to injuries sustained in a well-paid non-championship race at Hengelo (Netherlands) and during the Mallory Park Race of the Year (compression fractures of three vertebrae and five broken ribs). His first Grand Prix win coming on that bike at the Circuit de Spa-Francorchamps in Belgium, soon followed by a win on a 50cc Van Veen Kreidler at the Czechoslovakian Grand Prix held at the Masaryk Circuit, where he finished over two and a half minutes ahead.

For the 1972 season, Sheene was signed by Yamaha to ride a factory-supported Yamaha YZ635 for the 250cc World Championship under the French Yamaha importer Sonauto's banner. There was no Yamaha factory team at the time, but Sheene was one of six riders receiving support from the factory. However, at the third round in Austria, after losing a sprint to the finish line to the Australian John Dodds for third place, he voiced his displeasure to team management about the performance of the bike. The next Grand Prix was the Grand Prix of Nations at Imola at the end of May, but Sheene crashed in practice and broke his collarbone, preventing him from taking part in the race, and in the Isle of Man TT as well (which was the fifth Grand Prix of 1972). The next seven races of the world championship all took place in close succession in June and July and Barry was not fit to take part in them.

After the Yugoslavian Grand Prix, Sheene's factory-supported Yamaha YZ635 was given to Jarno Saarinen, already a Yamaha factory rider in the 350cc class, who went on to win four races and the 250cc World Championship that year. Once back to fitness, Sheene would get factory-supported Yamahas back for British races over the summer (Silverstone, Scarborough, Mallory Park) and for the last Grand Prix of the season, at the Montjuïc circuit in Spain on 23 September, where he scored a third place in the 250cc class.

Sheene was signed by Suzuki during the off season 1972–1973 and won the newly formed Formula 750 European championship for them in 1973. As a works Suzuki rider Sheene had two contracts, with the World Championship events taking precedence over his Suzuki GB contract for home and international events, if any race dates clashed. 

For 1974, Suzuki introduced the RG500 which Sheene rode to a second, third and a fourth scoring 30 points and finishing sixth in the World Championship. Also in 1974, he won the prestigious Mallory Park Race of the Year.

A spectacular crash at the Daytona 200 in the 1975 season threatened to end his career, breaking his left thigh, right arm, collarbone and two ribs, yet he recovered and was racing again seven weeks afterwards. Again riding the RG500 he scored an impressive first 500cc victory in June at the 1975 Dutch TT, edging out Giacomo Agostini. Sheene once again won the Mallory Park Race of the Year.

In the 1976 season, he won five 500cc Grands Prix, bringing him the World Championship. He took the Championship again in the 1977 season with six victories. For the 1977 season Sheene was partnered by Steve Parrish, who rode Sheene's 1976 Suzuki 500cc machine.

Sheene's battle with Kenny Roberts at the 1979 British Grand Prix at Silverstone has been cited as one of the greatest motorcycle Grand Prix races of the 1970s. After the 1979 season, he left the Heron-Suzuki factory team, believing that he was receiving inferior equipment to his teammates. He switched to a privateer on a Yamaha machine, but soon started receiving works equipment. In 1981, Roberts was the reigning World 500cc Champion for the third time in succession. Sheene, by now on a competitive Yamaha, was determined to take the championship from him. Sheene and Roberts battled all season and let Suzuki riders Marco Lucchinelli of Italy and American Randy Mamola beat them for the top two spots. Roberts finished third and Sheene fourth in the final World Championship standings. Sheene's win at the 1981 Swedish Grand Prix would be the last win for a British rider in the top category until Cal Crutchlow's debut win at the 2016 Czech Republic GP.

In a crash at Silverstone when riding his Yamaha, Sheene hit the unsighted machine of fallen Frenchman Patrick Igoa during practice for the 1982 British Grand Prix. His injured legs were saved by orthopaedic surgeon Mr Nigel John Cobb FRCS at the nearby Northampton General Hospital. This largely ended his potential as a title threat and he retired in 1984. He remains the only rider to win Grand Prix races in the 50 cc and 500 cc categories.

Sheene was known for being outspoken in his criticism of what he considered to be dangerous race tracks, most notably the Isle of Man TT course, which he considered too dangerous for world championship competition. He was a colourful, exuberant character who used his good looks, grin and London accent to good effect in self-promotion, and combined with an interest in business was one of the first riders to make a lot of money from endorsements. He is credited with boosting the appeal of motorcycle racing into the realm of the mass marketing media. He also tried his hand as a TV show host, including the ITV series Just Amazing!, where he interviewed people who had, through accident or design, achieved feats of daring and survival (including the former RAF air gunner, Nicholas Alkemade, who survived a fall of 18,000 feet without a parachute from a blazing Avro Lancaster bomber over Germany in March 1944). Sheene and his wife Stephanie also starred in the low-budget film Space Riders.

Personal life
Finding fame and wealth through racing, Sheene had houses in Putney, in south-west London, and in Wisbech, Cambridgeshire, and in 1977 he purchased a 700-year-old manor house in Charlwood, Surrey once owned by the actress Gladys Cooper. He was contracted by Faberge to promote their Brut aftershave lotion.

In 1975 while on crutches, Sheene met fashion-model-turned-glamour-model Stephanie McLean, who was Penthouse Pet of the Month for April 1970 and Pet of the Year in 1971, while they were working together on a photoshoot for Chrysler. She left her first husband for Sheene and after she had divorced, the couple married in 1984, having a son and a daughter.

Sheene enjoyed a lavish lifestyle, socialising with friends such as James Hunt, Ringo Starr and George Harrison, drinking and smoking heavily. He even had a hole drilled through the chin-bar on his full-face helmet allowing him to smoke right up to the start of a race.

Relocation to Australia
The Sheene family moved to Australia in the late 1980s, in the hope that the warmer climate would help relieve some of the pain of Sheene's injury-induced arthritis, settling in a property near the Gold Coast. He combined a property development business with a role as a commentator on motor sport. He began on SBS TV then moved to the Nine Network with Darrell Eastlake, and finally followed the TV broadcast rights of the Grand Prix motorcycle series to Network Ten. Further to this, on Network Ten Sheene co-hosted the weekly motor sport television show RPM from 1997 to 2002 with journalists Bill Woods and Greg Rust and was involved in Ten's coverage of other motor sport including V8 Supercars for several years.

In the 1990s, Sheene appeared in a series of well-known and popular television advertisements for Shell, with Australian motor sport icon Dick Johnson.

In later years, Sheene became involved in historic motorcycle racing, often returning to England to race at Donington Park. Sheene competed in his last UK race at the Goodwood Revival in 2002. He was also chosen to run with the Queen's Baton in the run-up to the 2002 Commonwealth Games held in Manchester, England.

Death
In July 2002, at the age of 51, Sheene was diagnosed with cancer of the oesophagus and stomach. Refusing conventional treatments involving chemotherapy, Sheene instead opted for a holistic approach involving a strict diet devised by Austrian healer Rudolf Breuss, intended to starve the cancer of nourishment.

He died at a hospital on Queensland's Gold Coast in 2003, aged 52, having suffered from the condition for eight months.
 
Sheene and his wife Stephanie had two children, Sidonie and Freddie.

Honours and awards
Following reconstruction of the Brands Hatch Circuit in England for safety concerns after requests by the FIM, the Dingle Dell section was changed for safety, and shortly after Sheene's death the new section was renamed Sheene's Corner in his honour. The FIM named him a Grand Prix "Legend" in 2001. For the 2003 season, V8 Supercars introduced a medal in honour of Sheene, the Barry Sheene Medal, for the 'best and fairest' driver of the season. A memorial ride from Bairnsdale to Phillip Island, Victoria is held by Australian motorcyclists annually, before the MotoGP held at the island.

He was the subject of This Is Your Life in 1978 when he was surprised by Eamonn Andrews at a motor racing cycle exhibition in London's Victoria.

In popular culture

A song titled "Mr. Sheene" that describes "Mr. Sheene's riding machine" was recorded by comedians Eric Idle and Rikki Fataar and released in 1978 as the B-side of the single "Ging Gang Goolie" under the names Dirk and Stig, their characters in Beatles-parody band The Rutles.

Sheene is also featured on a vase by ceramic artist Grayson Perry entitled My Heroes created in 1994.

In the UK television series Queer as Folk, the main characters Stuart and Vince reminisce about their teenage attraction to a photo of Sheene "On his motorbike! In his leathers..."

Career statistics

Motorcycle Grand Prix results
The following is a list of results achieved by Sheene.

(key) (Races in bold indicate pole position; races in italics indicate fastest lap)

Complete British Saloon Car Championship results
(key) (Races in bold indicate pole position; races in italics indicate fastest lap.)

† Events with 2 races staged for the different classes.

Complete European Touring Car Championship results

(key) (Races in bold indicate pole position) (Races in italics indicate fastest lap)

References

Further reading

External links

 Barry Sheene career statistics at MotoGP.com
  
 Barry Sheene profile at iomtt.com
 Interview with Stephanie McLean on her husband, Barry Sheene
 Barry Sheene's Penultimate Race article at visordown.com

1950 births
2003 deaths
50cc World Championship riders
125cc World Championship riders
500cc World Championship riders
British sports broadcasters
British Touring Car Championship drivers
British motorcycle racers
English motorcycle racers
Deaths from cancer in Queensland
Deaths from esophageal cancer
Deaths from stomach cancer
English emigrants to Australia
Members of the Order of the British Empire
Motorsport announcers
People from Holborn
Segrave Trophy recipients
Sportspeople from London
500cc World Riders' Champions